Potassium channel subfamily K member 2, also known as TREK-1, is a protein that in humans is encoded by the KCNK2 gene.

This gene encodes K2P2.1, a lipid-gated ion channel belonging to the two-pore-domain background potassium channel protein family. This type of potassium channel is formed by two homodimers that create a channel that releases potassium out of the cell to control resting membrane potential. The channel is opened by anionic lipid, certain anesthetics, membrane stretching, intracellular acidosis, and heat. Three transcript variants encoding different isoforms have been found for this gene.

Function in neurons 
TREK-1 is part of the subfamily of mechano-gated potassium channels that are present in mammalian neurons.  They can be gated in both chemical and physical ways and can be opened via both physical stimuli and chemical stimuli.  TREK-1 channels are found in a variety of tissues, but are particularly abundant in the brain and heart and are seen in various types of neurons.  The  C-terminal of TREK-1 channels plays a role in the mechanosensitivity of the channels.

In the neurons of the central nervous system, TREK-1 channels are important in physiological, pathophysiological, and pharmacological processes, including having a role in  electrogenesis, ischemia, and anesthesia. TREK-1 has an important role in neuroprotection against epilepsy and brain and spinal cord ischemia and is being evaluated as a potential target for new developments of therapeutic agents for neurology and anesthesiology.

In the absence of a properly functioning cytoskeleton, TREK-1 channels can still open via mechanical gating.  The cell membrane functions independently of the cytoskeleton and the thickness and curvature of the membrane is able to modulate the activity of the TREK-1 channels. The change in thickness is thought to be sensed by an amphipathic helix that extends from the inner leaflet of the membrane.

The insertion of certain compounds into the membrane, including inhaled anesthetics and propofol, activate TREK-1 through the enzyme phospholipase D2 (PLD2). Prior to the addition of anesthetic, PLD2 associates with GM-1 lipid rafts. After anesthetic, the enzyme or a complex of the enzyme and the channel traffic to PIP2 domains where the enzyme makes phosphatidic acid that opens the channel.

See also
 Tandem pore domain potassium channel

References

Further reading

External links 
 

Ion channels